The Central Bank of Uruguay (BCU) is the central bank of the Uruguay.

History
The Central Bank of Uruguay was established on July 6, 1967 as an autonomous state entity, with the passing of the 196th article of the Constitution of 1967. Prior to the creation of the BCU, the issuing of currency and managing and supervising of the banking system was handled by the department of the Banco de la República Oriental del Uruguay.

On March 30, 1995 a bank charter was passed (Law 16,696), which expanded the BCUs responsibilities and set out the management structure as well as the functions and responsibilities of the bank.

The headquarters of the Central Bank in Ciudad Vieja, Montevideo houses the Numismatic museum, in which both Uruguayan coins and banknotes from the Banco de la República and the Central Bank, as well as foreign ones, are exhibited.

Functions
According to the 7th article of the BCUs Charter, its responsibilities are;
 Issuer of money notes and coins, as well as their withdrawal throughout the republic
 Manage monetary, credit and currency exchanging as set out by law
 Act as economic advisor, banker and financial agent of the Government
 Administer the international reserves of the State
 Be the banker of all government institutions
 Represent the Uruguayan government at international financial organisations
 Regulate and supervise all financial institutions

List of presidents
List of the presidents of Central Bank of Uruguay.

See also

Bolsa de Valores de Montevideo
Economy of Uruguay
Uruguayan peso
Payment system
Real-time gross settlement

References

External links
  Official website

Government-owned companies of Uruguay
Uruguay
Economy of Uruguay
Banks of Uruguay
Museums in Montevideo
Organizations based in Montevideo
Ciudad Vieja, Montevideo
1967 establishments in Uruguay
Banks established in 1967